HrrF RNA (Haemophilus regulatory RNA responsive to iron Fe) is a  small non-coding RNA involved in iron homeostasis in Haemophilus species. Orthologues exist only among other Pasteurellacae. Iron- regulated sRNAs JA01- JA04 were identified in related Aggregatibacter. It is an analog  to PrrF and RyhB RNAs.  HrrF is maximally expressed when iron levels are low. Ferric uptake regulator (Fur) binds upstream of the  hrrF promoter.  HrrF stability is not dependent on the RNA chaperone Hfq. RNA-seq has shown that HrrF targets are   mRNAs of genes whose products  are involved in molybdate uptake, deoxyribonucleotide synthesis, and amino acid synthesis.

See also 
 NrrF RNA

References 

Non-coding RNA